Barret-sur-Méouge (literally Barret on Méouge) is a commune in the Hautes-Alpes department in southeastern France. It is located at the start of the 'Gorges de la Méouge' on the Méouge river.

Population

See also
Communes of the Hautes-Alpes department

References

Communes of Hautes-Alpes